Basant Kumar Birla (12 January 1921 – 3 July 2019) was an Indian businessman of the Birla family. He was chairman of the Krishnarpan Charity Trust, BK Birla Institute of Engineering & Technology (BKBIET) and various educational trusts and institutes.

Biography
Birla, the youngest son of philanthropist Ghanshyam Das Birla, was born on 12 January 1921. By fifteen years of age, he was already actively associated with a large number of companies and eventually became the chairman of Kesoram Industries. In this role, he concentrated on the industries of cotton, viscose, polyester and nylon yarns, refractory, paper, shipping, tyrecord, transparent paper, spun pipe, cement, tea, coffee, cardamom, chemicals, plywood, MDF Board, etc.

In 1959, he established the Indo Ethiopian Textiles Share Company, which was the first major joint venture by any Indian industrialist. In response, the Emperor of Ethiopia, Haile Selassie I, awarded him the medal of the Order of Menelik II, the highest Ethiopian award.

On 13 April 1942, he married Sarla, the daughter of activist and writer Brijlal Biyani, after having been introduced to each other by Jamnalal Bajaj and Mahatma Gandhi in 1941. They had a son, Aditya Vikram Birla and two daughters, Jayshree Birla and Manjushree Birla.

He was the chairman of the Krishnarpan Charity Trust, which runs an engineering college named BK Birla Institute of Engineering & Technology in Pilani, Rajasthan, the Swargashram Trust, which administers a Sanskrit school in Rishikesh. He also established Birla Public School in Qatar and the Birla College of Arts, Science & Commerce in Kalyan near Mumbai. He is the author of several books, including an autobiography entitled Svantah Sukhaya.

Birla died on 3 July 2019, at the age of 98.

See also
 Birla Family
 B K Birla Centre For Education

References

External links

1921 births
2019 deaths
Businesspeople from Kolkata
Founders of Indian schools and colleges
Indian businesspeople in textiles
Rajasthani people
20th-century Indian philanthropists
Recipients of Order of the Holy Trinity (Ethiopia)